Elie is a surname. Notable people with the surname include:

Freddy Elie (born 1946), Venezuelan football player and manager
Isaac Elie (born 1928), Sudanese hurdler
Jean-Marie Elie (born 1950), French football manager
Jennifer Elie (born 1986), American tennis player
Justin Elie (1883–1931), Haitian composer and pianist
Lolis Elie (died 2017), American lawyer 
Lolis Eric Elie (born 1963), American writer
Mario Elie (born 1963), American basketball player and coach 
Mbonda Elie, Cameroonian politician
Melissia Elie (born 1991), American-born Guyanese footballer
Paul Elie (born 1965), American writer and editor
Remi Elie (born 1995), Canadian ice hockey player
Roberto Elie (born 1959), Venezuelan football player

See also
 Elie (given name)
 Elie (disambiguation)

Surnames from given names